KPOU may refer to:

 Dutchess County Airport (ICAO code KPOU)
 KUNP, a television station (channel 16) licensed to La Grande, Oregon, United States, which held the call sign KPOU from May 2002 to December 2006